Darryl Devon ”D. J.” Smith Jr. (born February 24, 1989), is an American football coach and former linebacker who is currently the linebackers coach at the University of Missouri.  He was drafted by the Green Bay Packers out of Appalachian State University in the sixth round (186th pick overall) of the 2011 NFL Draft.

Early years
Smith attended Independence High School in Charlotte, North Carolina. Where he started for three years out of four and was part of a team that went undefeated and won four straight state titles. During his time at Independence High School he was often rotated between middle and outside linebacker. He was an all-state recognition twice, an all-conference nominee three times, and named team MVP his senior year. Smith also lettered three years in basketball.

College career
Smith went on to play for the Appalachian State University Mountaineers, where he led the NCAA Division I FCS in active tackles with 525 by the end of his career. He also became the first Appalachian State player since three-time NFL Pro Bowl nominee Dexter Coakley to have more than 500 tackles in his career. He majored in Business Management.

2007
Smith had an eventful first season with the Mountaineers, even though he did not hold the starting job until the seventh game of the season. Even so, he recorded more tackles than any Appalachian State freshman since Dexter Coakley in 1993, and had at least 10 tackles in five of his first nine starts. He was named the Southern Conference Defensive Player of the month for November after leading the conference in tackles with 49, interceptions with two, and passes deflected with five. His first interception was against The Citadel, which he ran back 43 yards for a touchdown. During this game, he broke the record for tackles by a freshman in a game (also held by Coakley). He was named the Southern Conference Player of the week after a game against Chattanooga after recording 14 tackles and 2 pass break-ups. In the National Championship game against the Delaware Fightin' Blue Hens, he recorded 10 more tackles.

2008
Following his successful freshman year, Smith continued on as the starting linebacker and started all 14 games. His arguably best performance of his sophomore season took place against the Samford Bulldogs, a game in which he had 16 tackles (12 solo). Following this game, was once named the Southern Conference defensive player of the week. He again received this honor after a contest against the Alabama Crimson Tide. Smith finished the season with 123 tackles, including 53 solo tackles. He finished second in the conference and 12th in the nation and received second-team Southern Conference honors.

2009
Smith's success at Appalachian State University continued into his junior year, a year in which he was elected a first-team All-American by the Sports Network, and all-conference by the coaches and media. He started all fourteen games of the season and tallied fourteen tackles in the opener against East Carolina University. He continued on to earn National and Southern Conference Defensive player of the week for his performance against Samford University with 17 tackles, the most by any Mountaineer since his Freshman year. He finished the season with 137 tackles (60 solo), and with two forced fumbles and recoveries, the most on the team.

2010
Continuing the streak, Smith started all 13 games in his final season as a Mountaineer and was once again named a First-team All American by the Sports Network and College Football News. He was named as a second-team all-American by Phil Steele, and to the third-team by the Associated Press. On top of this, he was given first-team all Southern-Conference honors by the Coaches and Media. Though he did in fact start every game that season, only six of them were at weak-side linebacker (The position he had played most of his career). He was then moved to middle linebacker due to injuries. Even so, he still posted double-digit tackles in ten out of thirteen games. His first start at linebacker came against Samford, where he intercepted a pass and returned it 26 yards to set up a touchdown. In his final season, he registered a career-high 146 tackles (5th nationally), with 76 of them being solo.

Professional career
Smith was thought by scouts to be on the shorter side for a linebacker. Some noted that he "has trouble finding the ball inside at times due to his lack of height." Scouts stated that his arms were too small and limited his ability to "grab NFL backs on the way through or get off blocks". They also stated that he had a habit of overrunning plays. On the positive side, they remarked that Smith was a "Thick, compact linebacker", who often "Scrapes down the line, stays square to get to the ball". NFL scouts also said that he was good at changing directions with limited space and that he was an "Excellent wrap-up tackler in space".

Green Bay Packers
Smith was selected by the Packers 186 overall with the second of three sixth round picks in the 2011 NFL Draft. Smith responded to being drafted by stating: "I'm ecstatic that Green Bay saw my talent and decided to pick me up.”

Smith was released by the Packers on April 24, 2013 after he failed a physical.

San Diego Chargers
Smith was claimed off waivers by the San Diego Chargers on April 25, 2013. He was released before the season.

Houston Texans
Smith signed with the Houston Texans on November 13, 2013.

Carolina Panthers
Smith signed with the Carolina Panthers on January 3, 2014.

Coaching career
After his playing career ended, Smith accepted an offer from his former high school coach to be the defensive coordinator at Vance High School in Charlotte, North Carolina. He accepted a position at his alma mater Appalachian State in 2016 as the program's director of recruiting relations. He was reassigned to a defensive analyst position in 2017, and promoted to outside linebackers coach in 2018.

Smith was named the linebackers coach at Missouri in 2020.

References

External links

 

1989 births
Living people
Players of American football from Charlotte, North Carolina
American football linebackers
Appalachian State Mountaineers football players
Green Bay Packers players
San Diego Chargers players
Houston Texans players
Carolina Panthers players
High school football coaches in North Carolina
Appalachian State Mountaineers football coaches
Missouri Tigers football coaches